This is a list of adaptations in film, television, musical theater, and video games, based on characters from the Peanuts comic strip by Charles M. Schulz.

Feature films

Reception

Box office performance

Television

Specials

Documentary specials

DVD Collections 
A series of releases from Warner Home Video, collecting the prime-time TV specials in chronological order of their original production and airing. Each volume of the collection contains six specials on two DVDs, with each volume covering half a decade (the first special was 1965). All 1960s/1970s specials are included in these collections except the documentary specials. The Emmy-Honored ‘Peanuts’ Collection contains 11 specials (From the late 70s to early 90s) that have earned or won an Emmy Award.

The Charlie Brown and Snoopy Show

This Is America, Charlie Brown mini-series

Peanuts

Season 1 (2016)

Snoopy in Space

Season 1 (2019)

Season 2 (2021)

The Snoopy Show

Season 1 (2021)

Season 2 (2022)

Other specials

Peanuts Motion Comics

Educational films 
The Peanuts characters have also appeared in educational videos, which were produced in the 1970s and 1980s and distributed on 16mm film to schools.

Webseries

Musicals

Video games

Commercials

References

Footnotes